Capstone Infrastructure Corporation is a Toronto, Ontario-based open-ended trust that invests in the following types of power generation assets: Natural Gas cogeneration, Wind, Hydro, Biomass and Solar. It was formerly known as Macquarie Power & Infrastructure Income Fund.

Corporate History
Macquarie Power & Infrastructure Income Fund (MP&I) first listed on the Toronto Stock Exchange in April 2004 as Macquarie Power Income Fund with the 156MW Cardinal natural gas plant as its sole asset. In April 2005, the fund's founding President & CEO Bob Rollison announced a broader acquisition strategy that would include infrastructure assets beyond the energy sector.

Leisureworld Acquisition and Divestiture
This broader mandate allowed MP&I to acquire 45% of Leisureworld, an operator of Long-Term care facilities in Ontario, in 2005. However, management opted to divest this asset in 2009 - arguing that they wanted to focus more on "core infrastructure categories, such as power generation, electricity transmission or distribution, and utilities and transportation."

Subsidiaries & Related Firms

Regional Power
Regional Power, a subsidiary of Manulife Financial, oversees the day-to-day operations at MP&I's four hydro facilities (Sechelt, Hluey Lakes, Dryden and Wawatay).

Clean Energy Income Fund
In June 2007, MP&I completed the purchase of Clean Power Income Fund, which roughly doubled its assets. This transaction marked MP&I's entry into the renewable energy market, as it acquired one wind farm (Erie Shores), four hydro projects (Sechelt, Hluey Lakes, Wawatay and Dryden), the Whitecourt biomass plant, and a 31.3% interest in the Chapais biomass plant.

Projects

Operational Power Projects

Projects Under Construction
MP&I is developing a 20MW solar park in Amherstburg, Ontario. SunPower has been contracted to design, build and operate the facility, which has been awarded a 30-year Power Purchase Agreement by the Ontario Power Authority.

References and footnotes

External links
Official website

Electric power companies of Canada
Companies listed on the Toronto Stock Exchange